Bolshiye Yasyrki is a rural locality (a settlement) in Perelyoshinskoye Urban Settlement, Paninsky District, Voronezh Oblast, Russia. The population was 223 as of 2010. There are 6 streets.

Geography 
Bolshiye Yasyrki is located 14 km northeast of Panino (the district's administrative centre) by road. Alekseyevka is the nearest rural locality.

References 

Rural localities in Paninsky District